Linden is a rural locality in the Shire of Paroo, Queensland, Australia. In the  Linden had a population of 20 people.

Geography 
Linden is in the Channel Country. It is flat land, about 180 to 200 metres above sea level. The Balonne Highway passes from east  (Nebine) to west (Cunnamulla) through the southern part of the locality.

The land use is grazing on native vegetation.

History 
In the  Linden had a population of 20 people.

Economy 
There are a number of homesteads in the locality, including:

 Ardglen
 Blairmore
 Charlotte Vale
 Clestraine
 Clover Lake
 Cobbrum
 Deiran
 Linden
 Lulworth
 Markarene
 Mayvale
 Melray
 Mooro
 Nara
 Nulbear
 South Glen

Transport 
There are a number of airstrips in the locality, including:

 Blairmore airstrip
Heywood airstrip
Lulworth airstrip
 Nulbear airstrip
 South Glen airstrip

References 

Shire of Paroo
Localities in Queensland